Shekar Dattatri is an Indian herpetologist and wildlife filmmaker from Chennai, Tamil Nadu.

Career
Shekar Dattatri's lifelong fascination with wildlife began at the age of 14, when he joined the famous Madras Snake Park as a student-volunteer. This led to nature photography and, subsequently, to filmmaking. He also was among the discoverers of the snake species Oligodon nikhili.

Publications
Whitaker, Romulus; Dattatri, Shekar (1982). "A new species of Oligodon from the Palni Hills, South India (Serpentes: Colubridae)". Journal of the Bombay Natural History Society 79 (3): 630-631).

Filmography
The Truth About Tigers
A cooperative for Snake Catchers

References

Living people
Indian filmmakers
Indian herpetologists
Year of birth missing (living people)